Brett Adam Hestla (born February 4, 1973) is an American musician.

Career 
In the late 1990s, Hestla's band Virgos Merlot was signed to Atlantic Records. After their first release, Signs of a Vacant Soul, he became the touring bassist for Creed after the departure of Brian Marshall. When Creed disbanded in 2004, Hestla began a career as a record producer, forming the independent label Silent Majority in Orlando, Florida and working with bands such as The Supervillains, Framing Hanley, Transmit Now, Faktion, Tantric, Redfine, Refuse The Fall, Bad Axis, Iodine Sky, Calefactor and Seven Day Sonnet.

In 2005, Hestla became the lead vocalist of Dark New Day. Dark New Day released their first full length, Twelve Year Silence later that year. The band's single "Brother" reached #7 on the U.S. Mainstream Rock charts.

After touring, Clint Lowery returned to Sevendust and Mclawhorn and Hunt joined Evanescence, causing Dark New Day to disband. Hestla began producing for new and up-and-coming bands.

In 2014, he formed a band called A Dark Line. The band released their debut EP called Running From The Light in 2015, available for download only.

References 

1973 births
Living people
Record producers from Alabama
American rock bass guitarists
Nu metal singers
American rock guitarists
American male bass guitarists
Creed (band) members
Dark New Day members
21st-century American singers
21st-century American bass guitarists
21st-century American male singers